Potoka may refer to:

 Potoka, Bulgaria
 Potoka, Poland
 Former Hungarian language name of the Slovak village Potoky
 Kříž u potoka
 Mikroregion Povodí Mratínského potoka

See also 
 Potok (disambiguation)
 Patak (disambiguation)